Washington's 41st legislative district is one of forty-nine districts in Washington state for representation in the state legislature. It covers all of Mercer Island and Newcastle, with portions of Bellevue, Renton, Issaquah, and Sammamish.

The district's legislators are state senator Lisa Wellman and state representatives Tana Senn (position 1) and My-Linh Thai (position 2), all Democrats.

See also
Washington Redistricting Commission
Washington State Legislature
Washington State Senate
Washington House of Representatives

References

External links
Washington State Redistricting Commission
Washington House of Representatives
Map of Legislative Districts

41